is a Japanese manga artist. Umezawa is best known for the manga series Hareluya II Bøy and Bremen. He was also a former assistant to Tsukasa Hojo and Takehiko Inoue.

Works
Sakenomi☆Dōji (Weekly Shōnen Jump, 1990)
Hareluya (Weekly Shōnen Jump, 1992)	  	
Hareluya II Bøy (Weekly Shōnen Jump, 1992–1999)
Bremen (Weekly Shōnen Jump, 2000–2001)  	   	
Detective Dance (One-shot; Weekly Shōnen Jump, 2000)
Sword Breaker (Weekly Shōnen Jump, 2002)
Live (Weekly Shōnen Jump, 2004) 	  	
Countach (Weekly Young Jump, 2004–2012)

External links

1966 births
Living people
Manga artists